Asarum splendens, the Chinese wild ginger or showy Sichuan ginger, is a species of wild ginger.

Images

References

External links

Herbs
Splendens